This is a list of the winners and nominations for the Primetime Emmy Award for Outstanding Casting for a Reality Program. The award was instituted in 2017 and recognizes casting for reality-competition, structured and unstructured reality programs.

Winners and nominations

2010s

2020s

Programs with multiple wins
2 wins
 Queer Eye
 RuPaul's Drag Race

Programs with multiple nominations

6 nominations
 RuPaul's Drag Race

5 nominations
 Queer Eye
 The Voice

4 nominations
 Born This Way

2 nominations
 Project Runway
 Shark Tank
 Top Chef

Total awards by network
 Netflix - 3
 VH1 – 2
 A&E - 1

References

Casting for a Reality Program
Casting awards